Notable events of 2004 in webcomics.

Events

 The Double Fine Comics collaboration is launched in February 2004.
 Online retailer of webcomic-related merchandise TopatoCo is established by Jeffrey Rowland.
 Publisher Seven Seas Entertainment is founded by Jason DeAngelis.
 The Penny Arcade Expo was held for the first time, in Bellevue, Washington.

Awards
Web Cartoonist's Choice Awards, "Outstanding Comic" won by two comics: Adrian Ramos's Count Your Sheep, and Mike Krahulik and Jerry Holkins's Penny Arcade.
Ignatz Awards, "Outstanding Online Comic" won by James Kochalka's American Elf.

Webcomics started

 January 1 — XQUZYPHYR & Overboard by August J. Pollak
 January 18 — Powerpuff Girls Doujinshi by Vinson Ngo
 March 16 — Two Lumps by James L. Grant and Mel Hynes
 April 2 — New Gold Dreams by R. K. Milholland
 May 5 — Smile by Raina Telgemeier
 June 4 — Town Called Dobson by Storm Bear
 June 7 — Little Dee by Christopher Baldwin
 June 25 — Candi by Starline Xiomara Hodge
 June — 319 Dark Street by David Wade
 July 5 — Rob and Elliot by Clay and Hampton Yount
 July 15 — A Lesson Is Learned But The Damage Is Irreversible by David Hellman and Dale Beran
 July — Bouletcorp by Boulet
 July — Contemplating Reiko by Vincent Grisanti
 July 15 — Spamusement! by Steven Frank
 July 27 — Joe and Monkey by Zach Miller
 August 3 — The Adventures of Dr. McNinja by Christopher Hastings
 August 22 — Bunny by Lem
 September 10 — Beaver and Steve by James Turner
 September 29 — Girls With Slingshots by Danielle Corsetto
 December 12 — Grim Tales from Down Below by Vinson Ngo
 December 31 — Sokora Refugees by Semaui and Melissa Dejesus
 December — Stuff Sucks by Liz Greenfield
 Adventure Log by Scott Ramsoomair
 Alien Loves Predator by Bernie Hou
 Arbit Choudhury by Shubham Choudhury and Hemantkumar Jain
 Canadiana: the New Spirit of Canada by Sandy Carruthers, Jeff Alward, and Mark Shainblum
 Chikan Otoko by Takuma Yokota
 I Drew This by D. C. Simpson
 Mom's Cancer by Brian Fies

Webcomics ended
 It's Walky! by David Willis, 1999 – 2004
 The Morning Improv by Scott McCloud, 2001 – 2004
 Demonology 101 by Faith Erin Hicks, 2002  – 2004

References

 
Webcomics by year